Colpothrinax wrightii, the palma barrigona, is a species of flowering plant in the family Arecaceae.

It is endemic to Cuba.

References

wrightii
Endemic flora of Cuba
Vulnerable plants
Taxonomy articles created by Polbot